The Brand New Testament is a 2015 fantasy dark comedy film written, produced, and directed by Jaco Van Dormael. It is a co-production among  Belgium, France, and Luxembourg. The film was screened at the Directors' Fortnight section at the 2015 Cannes Film Festival. It was selected as the Belgian entry for the Best Foreign Language Film at the 88th Academy Awards, making the December shortlist of nine films, but was not nominated. The Brand New Testament received ten nominations at the 6th Magritte Awards, winning four awards, including Best Film and Best Director for Van Dormael. The film has become a cult film.

Plot
God lives in an apartment in Brussels which he shares with his meek wife and his 10-year-old daughter Ea, to whom he is emotionally and physically abusive. God is a grumpy sadist who created humankind specifically to have something to torment. He manipulates reality via a personal computer which he forbids his family from accessing. One day, Ea sneaks into his office and discovers how he has been mistreating humans. This enrages God who then whips Ea with his belt. Ea decides to rebel against her father. She steals the key to His office and accesses the scheduled dates of death of every human in the world and releases the information to them via their portable telephones. Everyone with a cell phone receives a text message informing them exactly when they will die. Ea then locks God's computer and escapes from the apartment through a washing machine which provides a tunnel to the outside world. Wandering the streets of Brussels, Ea decides to follow in the footsteps of her brother Jesus and write a Brand New Testament as her contribution to the human race. She selects six apostles to narrate their life stories. She first enlists a homeless man, Victor, to be her scribe, since she cannot write well.

The first apostle is a reclusive woman who lost her left arm in an accident and feels nobody will love her. The second is a man who hates his work and his life, who has decided to never move from a bench in the park now that he knows the date of his death. Ea translates to allow him to converse with a bird. This induces him to follow a flock of birds to the North Pole. The third apostle is a sexually frustrated man who is awkward with women and remains lovesick for a German girl he met once as a boy. With Ea's encouragement, he becomes a voice actor for porn movies, where he encounters and establishes a relationship with his lifelong fixation. The fourth apostle is a man who is fascinated with death and killing. He purchases a rifle and shoots people knowing that, since all death dates are already predetermined, they can not be his responsibility. Ea prods him to shoot a woman, the first apostle. He hits her in her prosthetic arm. Believing this to be a divine signal, he courts the woman and they establish a relationship, and he learns to embrace life instead of death. The fifth apostle is an elderly woman trapped in a loveless marriage, especially now that her husband knows he will outlive her by many years. Ea persuades her to cheat on her husband. She has sex with a young male prostitute, and then forms a love relationship with a gorilla. The gorilla scares her husband away, to her delight. The sixth apostle is a sickly boy who, with only days left to live, decides to live them as a girl. Ea encourages her to live each day as the equivalent of one month.

God is horrified when he discovers what Ea has done and that he can no longer torment humans. Locked out of his computer, he is powerless. He leaves the apartment using the chute in the laundry room, and in the real world he suffers all the mistreatment and frustrations he created for mankind. He is assaulted by everyone he meets. He discovers to his horror that the tunnel to his apartment has disappeared and he is trapped on Earth powerless and alone. He takes shelter in a church, where his outrageous criticism of his son Jesus Christ provokes a charitable priest into beating him senseless and eventually deporting him to Uzbekistan with a group of illegal immigrants.

Ea and her apostles go to the seaside where hundreds of people have gathered to spend the last hours of their lives. An airplane, which happens to be carrying God under police escort, falls out of the sky and threatens to crash onto the beach and kill everyone. At the last moment, however, God's wife realizes that the number of apostles has grown to 18, her favorite number, explores her husband's work space, unwittingly restarts his computer, and begins to configure a new life for mankind. She deletes the messages that notified people of their death date. The airplane regains altitude and a new creation is born under a flower-filled sky. Victor publishes the Brand New Testament which becomes a bestseller and catapults him out of hopeless poverty into a whole new life of fame and fortune. God reaches Uzbekistan where he works on an assembly line manufacturing washing machines. He keeps on searching without success for the washing machine with the escape hatch that will take him back to his apartment.

Cast 

 François Damiens as François (fourth apostle)
 Didier De Neck as Jean-Claude (second apostle)
 Catherine Deneuve as Martine (fifth apostle)
 Pascal Duquenne as Georges
 Romain Gelin as Willy (sixth apostle)
 Pili Groyne as God's daughter, Ea
 Johan Heldenbergh as The priest
 Serge Larivière as Marc (third apostle)
 Johan Leysen as Martine's husband
 Marco Lorenzini as Victor (the scribe)
 Yolande Moreau as God's wife
 David Murgia as Jesus Christ
 Benoît Poelvoorde as God
 Laura Verlinden as Aurélie (first apostle)

Reception
The Brand New Testament received generally favorable reviews from film critics. On Rotten Tomatoes, the film holds an approval rating of 82%, based on 74 reviews with an average rating of 7/10. The website's critical consensus reads, "The Brand New Testament takes a surreal, subversive, and funny look at Biblical themes through a modern — and refreshingly original — lens." At Metacritic, the film received an average score of 70 out of 100, based on 17 reviews from mainstream critics, indicating "generally favorable reviews".

Accolades

See also
 List of submissions to the 88th Academy Awards for Best Foreign Language Film
 List of Belgian submissions for the Academy Award for Best Foreign Language Film

References

External links 
 
 
 
 

2015 films
2015 black comedy films
2015 fantasy films
Belgian black comedy films
Belgian fantasy films
Films critical of Christianity and Christians
French black comedy films
French fantasy films
2010s French-language films
Cultural depictions of Adam and Eve
Films critical of religion
Films directed by Jaco Van Dormael
Films set in Brussels
Films shot in Brussels
Fiction about God
Luxembourgian comedy films
Magritte Award winners
Portrayals of Jesus in film
French-language Belgian films
French-language Luxembourgian films
2010s French films